Linley is a hamlet in Shropshire, England. It is part of the civil parish of More.

The hamlet is located approximately 2 miles (3.2 km) east of the A488 road, and 2 miles north of the village of Lydham, and 3.5 miles north of Bishop's Castle. It is situated near the West Onny river and a local feature is Linley Hall.

Geology
On 2 April 1990, the Pontesford-Linley Fault registered an earthquake with a magnitude of 5.1 on the Richter scale, known as the Bishop's Castle earthquake.

See also
Listed buildings in More, Shropshire

References

Hamlets in Shropshire